Coenagriocnemis insulare is a species of damselfly in the family Coenagrionidae. It is endemic to Mauritius.  Its natural habitats are subtropical or tropical moist lowland forests and rivers. It is threatened by habitat loss.

References

Insects of Mauritius
Endemic fauna of Mauritius
Coenagrionidae
Insects described in 1872
Taxa named by Edmond de Sélys Longchamps
Taxonomy articles created by Polbot
Taxobox binomials not recognized by IUCN